Jitsi (from  — «wires») is a collection of free and open-source multiplatform voice (VoIP), video conferencing and instant messaging applications for the web platform, Windows, Linux, macOS, iOS and Android. The Jitsi project began with the Jitsi Desktop (previously known as SIP Communicator). With the growth of WebRTC, the project team focus shifted to the Jitsi Videobridge for allowing web-based multi-party video calling. Later the team added Jitsi Meet, a full video conferencing application that includes web, Android, and iOS clients. Jitsi also operates meet.jit.si, a version of Jitsi Meet hosted by Jitsi for free community use. Other projects include: Jigasi, lib-jitsi-meet, Jidesha, and Jitsi.

Jitsi has received support from various institutions such as the NLnet Foundation, the University of Strasbourg and the Region of Alsace, the European Commission and it has also had multiple participations in the Google Summer of Code program.

History 
Work on Jitsi (then SIP Communicator) started in 2003 in the context of a student project by Emil Ivov at the University of Strasbourg. It was originally released as an example video phone in the JAIN-SIP stack and later spun off as a standalone project.

BlueJimp (2009–2015) 
In 2009, Emil Ivov founded the BlueJimp company, which has employed some of Jitsi's main contributors, in order to offer professional support and development services related to the project.

In 2011, after successfully adding support for audio/video communication over XMPP's Jingle extensions, the project was renamed to Jitsi since it was no longer "a SIP only Communicator". This name originates from the Bulgarian "жици" (wires).

Jitsi introduced the Videobridge in 2013 to support multiparty video calling with its Jitsi clients using a new Selective Forwarding Unit (SFU) architecture. Later that year initial support was added to the Jitsi Videobridge allowing WebRTC calling from the browser. To demonstrate how Jitsi Videobridge could be used as a production service, BlueJimp offered a free use of its hosted system at meet.jit.si.

On November 4, 2014, "Jitsi + Ostel" scored 6 out of 7 points on the Electronic Frontier Foundation's secure messaging scorecard. They lost a point because there has not been a recent independent code audit.

On February 1, 2015, Hristo Terezov, Ingo Bauersachs and the rest of the team released version 2.6 from their stand at the Free and Open Source Software Developers' European Meeting 2015 event in Brussels. This release includes security fixes, removes support of the deprecated MSN protocol, along with SSLv3 in XMPP. Among other notable improvements, the OS X version bundles a Java 8 runtime, enables echo cancelling by default, and uses the CoreAudio subsystem. The Linux build addresses font issues with the GTK+ native look and feel, and fixes some long-standing issues about microphone level on call setup when using the PulseAudio sound system. This release also adds the embedded Java database Hyper SQL Database to improve performance for users with huge configuration files, a feature which is disabled by default. A full list of changes is available on the project web site.

Ownership by Atlassian (2015–2018) 
Atlassian acquired BlueJimp on April 5, 2015. After the acquisition, the new Jitsi team under Atlassian ceased meaningful new development work on the Jitsi Desktop project and expanded its efforts on projects related to the Jitsi Videobridge and Jitsi Meet. Regular contributions from the open source community have maintained the Jitsi Desktop project.

In 2017, jitsi was added as a widget to Element instant messaging client.

8x8 (2018– ) 
In October 2018, 8x8 acquired Jitsi from Atlassian.

Primary projects 

The Jitsi open source repository on GitHub currently contains 132 repositories. The major projects include:
Jitsi Meet Video conferencing server designed for quick installation on Debian/Ubuntu servers
Jitsi Videobridge WebRTC Selective Forwarding Unit engine for powering multiparty conferences
Jigasi Server-side application that allows regular SIP clients to join Jitsi Meet conferences hosted by Jitsi Videobridge
lib-jitsi-meet Low-level JavaScript API for providing a customized UI for Jitsi Meet
Jidesha Chrome extension for Jitsi Meet
Jitsi Known as Jitsi Desktop, an audio, video, and chat communicator application that supports protocols such as SIP, XMPP/Jabber, AIM/ICQ, and IRC.

Jitsi Meet 

Jitsi Meet is an open source JavaScript WebRTC application used primarily for video conferencing. In addition to audio and video, screen sharing is available, and new members can be invited via a generated link. The interface is accessible via web browser or with a mobile app. The Jitsi Meet server software can be downloaded and installed on Linux-based computers. Jitsi owner 8x8 maintains a free public-use server for up to 100 participants at meet.jit.si.

Key features of Jitsi Meet
 Encrypted communication (secure communication): As of April 2020, 1–1 calls use the P2P mode, which is end-to-end encrypted via DTLS-SRTP between the two participants. Group calls also use DTLS-SRTP encryption, but rely on the Jitsi Videobridge (JVB) as video router, where packets are decrypted temporarily. The Jitsi team emphasizes that "they are never stored to any persistent storage and only live in memory while being routed to other participants in the meeting", and that this measure is necessary due to current limitations of the underlying WebRTC technology.
 No need of new client software installation.

Jitsi Videobridge 
Jitsi Videobridge is a video conferencing solution supporting WebRTC that allows multiuser video communication. It is a Selective Forwarding Unit (SFU) and only forwards the selected streams to other participating users in the video conference call, therefore, CPU horsepower is not that critical for performance.

Jitsi Desktop 
Jitsi spawned some sister projects such as the Jitsi Videobridge Selective Forwarding Unit (SFU) and Jitsi Meet, a video and web conferencing application. To prevent misunderstanding due to the increasing popularity of these other Jitsi projects, the Jitsi client application was rebranded as Jitsi Desktop.

Originally the project was mostly used as an experimentation tool because of its support for IPv6. Through the years, as the project gathered members, it also added support for protocols other than SIP.

Jitsi Desktop is no longer actively maintained by the Jitsi team, but it is still maintained by the community.

Features
Jitsi supports multiple operating systems, including Windows as well as Unix-like systems such as Linux, Mac OS X and BSD. The mobile apps can be downloaded on the App Store for iOS and on the Google Play Store and F-droid platform for Android. It also includes:
 Attended and blind call transfer
 Auto away
 Auto re-connect
 Auto answer and auto forward
 Call recording
 Call encryption with SRTP and ZRTP
 Conference calls
 Direct media connection establishment with the ICE protocol
 Desktop Streaming
 Encrypted password storage using a master password
 File transfer for XMPP, AIM/ICQ, Windows Live Messenger, YIM
 Instant messaging encryption with OTR (end-to-end encrypted)
 IPv6 support for SIP and XMPP
 Media relaying with the TURN protocol
 Message waiting indication (RFC 3842)
 Voice and video calls for SIP and XMPP using H.264 and H.263 or VP8 for video encoding
 Wideband audio with SILK, G.722, Speex and Opus
 DTMF support with SIP INFO, RTP (RFC 2833/RFC 4733), In-band
 Zeroconf via mDNS/DNS-SD (à la Apple's Bonjour)
 DNSSEC
 Group video support (Jitsi Videobridge)
 Packet loss concealment with the SILK and Opus codecs

Reception 

In an April 2020 test of video conferencing services, US product review owned by the New York Times Wirecutter recommended Jitsi Meet as one of its two picks (after the more feature-rich Cisco Webex which it found preferable for large groups and enterprises), stating that Jitsi was "easy to use and reliable" and that "in our testing, the video quality and audio quality were both great—noticeably sharper and crisper than on Zoom or Webex".

In a follow-up review in November 2020, Wirecutter lowered its previous rating, stating that Jitsi was, other than Google Hangouts, "the best, easiest-to-use free services you can find", but also pointed out that "the video and audio quality were both acceptable, though our panelists rated them among the lowest of all the services we tested".

Jitsi has been well adopted in not-for-profit tech sector as default alternative to corporate tools. In mid-March 2020 popular Lyon-based tech NGO Framasoft reported that their Jitsi servers were even overloaded by use of state institutions. Jitsi has been test-used as Wikimedia Meet in Wikimedia Foundation on Wikimedia Cloud Services since spring 2020, with high adoption rates initially but mixed reviews.

See also 
 Comparison of instant messaging protocols
 Comparison of instant messaging clients
 Comparison of VoIP software
 Comparison of web conferencing software
 List of free and open-source software packages
 Wowza Streaming Engine
 Session Initiation Protocol

References

External links 

 

2003 software
AIM (software) clients
Cross-platform free software
Free and open-source Android software
Free instant messaging clients
Free software programmed in Java (programming language)
Free VoIP software
Free XMPP clients
Instant messaging clients programmed in Java
MacOS instant messaging clients
Portable software
Videoconferencing software programmed in Java
Videotelephony
Voice over IP clients programmed in Java
VoIP software
Web conferencing
WebRTC
Windows instant messaging clients